Ellisville is a town in and the first county seat of Jones County, Mississippi, United States. The population was 4,448 at the time of the 2010 census, up from 3,465 at the 2000 census. The Jones County Courthouse is located here, as is much of the county government.

The state legislature authorized a second county seat at Laurel, to the northeast, which developed as the center of lumber and textile mills, with a much larger population. Ellisville is part of the Laurel micropolitan statistical area.

History
The town is named for Powhatan Ellis, a former U.S. senator for Mississippi who identified as a descendant of Pocahontas and her father, Chief Powhatan in Virginia. Ellisville was designated as the county seat, and it became the major commercial and population center of Jones County through the early decades of development in the nineteenth century.

During the Civil War, Ellisville and Jones County were a center of pro-Union resistance. The county had mostly yeomen farmers and cattle herders, who were not slaveholders. Slaves constituted 12% of the county's population in 1860, the lowest proportion of slaves of any county in the state in 1860, as conditions generally did not support cultivation of large cotton plantations. Many local men resented going to war to support slaveholders, and worried about the survival of their families, where women and children worked to keep subsistence farms going. They resented Confederate tax collectors who took the goods and stores their families needed to live.

Confederate deserters and refugee slaves formed a resistance group known as the Knight Company, led by Newton Knight, First Lieutenant Jasper Collins, and Second Lieutenant William Wesley Sumrall. They were known to take refuge in a swamp along the Leaf River. Along with as many as 100 other Southern men, they fought several skirmishes with Confederate tax men, then other Confederate units eventually sent to crush the resistance. In 1864 they took control in Ellisville, raising the United States flag over the courthouse in place of the Confederate flag.

In 1919, Ellisville hosted one of the most gruesome lynchings in history, when a black man, John Hartfield was found to have a white girlfriend. A story was concocted about a rape, and Hartfield was captured by law enforcement. The Jackson Daily News ran headlines that "John Hartfield will be lynched by Ellisville mob at 5:00 this afternoon", and that a crowd of thousands was expected to attend. A crowd of around 10,000 came to watch Hartfield hanged from a tree, then shot repeatedly. When his body was cut down, pieces were cut off for souvenirs and what remained was burned. Commemorative postcards were printed.

In the late 19th and early 20th centuries, Ellisville lost primacy to nearby Laurel, which became a center of the timber industry and cotton textile mills. Its population in the mid-20th century was nearly six times that of Ellisville. Laurel has attracted other industries and is the center of a micropolitan statistical area comprising all of Jones County and Jasper County. The Jones County Sheriff's Department is based in Laurel, but the county government is still based in Ellisville, at the Jones County Courthouse.

Ellisville reflects the demographics of the county and is majority white. Laurel is majority African American in population, reflecting the migration of agricultural workers to the city for industrial and urban jobs.

Geography
Ellisville is located in central Jones County at  (31.601068, −89.202123). U.S. Route 11 runs through the center of town, while Interstate 59 runs through the northwest side, with access from Exits 85, 88, and 90. Both highways lead northeast  to Laurel and southwest  to Hattiesburg. Mississippi Highway 29 crosses US-11 near the center of town, leading northwest  to Soso and southeast  to Runnelstown.

Demographics

2020 census

As of the 2020 United States census, there were 4,652 people, 1,264 households, and 810 families residing in the city.

2000 census
As of the census of 2000, there were 3,465 people, 1,220 households, and 795 families residing in the town. The population density was 628.9 people per square mile (242.8/km2). There were 1,380 housing units at an average density of 250.5 per square mile (96.7/km2). The racial makeup of the town was 67.42% White, 30.91% African American, 0.20% Native American, 0.17% Asian, 0.61% from other races, and 0.69% from two or more races. Hispanic or Latino of any race were 1.47% of the population.

There were 1,220 households, out of which 27.0% had children under the age of 18 living with them, 42.0% were married couples living together, 19.0% had a female householder with no husband present, and 34.8% were non-families. 31.3% of all households were made up of individuals, and 13.4% had someone living alone who was 65 years of age or older. The average household size was 2.41 and the average family size was 3.02.

In the town, the population was spread out, with 22.4% under the age of 18, 10.2% from 18 to 24, 27.6% from 25 to 44, 22.5% from 45 to 64, and 17.3% who were 65 years of age or older. The median age was 39 years. For every 100 females, there were 92.3 males. For every 100 females age 18 and over, there were 85.3 males. The median income for a household in the town was $23,424, and the median income for a family was $27,955. Males had a median income of $26,477 versus $22,537 for females. The per capita income for the town was $12,822. About 21.1% of families and 35.0% of the population were below the poverty line, including 36.8% of those under age 18 and 28.5% of those age 65 or over.

Education

Ellisville is served by the Jones County School District. South Jones High School is located in Ellisville. Their mascot is the Braves.

Ellisville is also home to Jones County Junior College. Their mascot is the Bobcats.

Notable people

 Lance Bass, pop singer and member of 'N Sync, raised in Ellisville
 Harry Craft, MLB player and manager, first manager of the Houston Colt .45s and minor league manager of Mickey Mantle
 Les DeVall, former head coach for McNeese State Cowboys football team
 Redd Foxx, actor, comedian. Raised by his grandmother during formative years.
 John Hartfield, a black man from Ellisville who was lynched and dismembered for having a white girlfriend
 Henry McCall, former Negro league first baseman
 Chris McDaniel, State Senator, attorney and host of the nationally syndicated The Right Side Radio Show
 Buddy Myer, two-time All-Star second baseman for the MLB Washington Senators in the 1930s, batting and stolen base titles
 Arnett Nelson, jazz musician
 Scottie Phillips, former National Football League running back
 Jeremiah Price, professional football player in the National Arena League
 Donnie Scoggin, member of the Mississippi House of Representatives
 Bobby Shows, former member of the Mississippi House of Representatives
 Jason Simpson, head coach of the UT Martin Skyhawks football team
 L. C. Ulmer, delta blues musician

See also

 List of cities in Mississippi
 Free State of Jones

References

External links
 
 Ellisville at City-data.com

Cities in Mississippi
Cities in Jones County, Mississippi
County seats in Mississippi
Cities in Laurel micropolitan area
U.S. Route 11